Jozef Adamec (26 February 1942 – 24 December 2018) was a Slovak football forward and manager.

Adamec won seven Czechoslovak First League titles in his club career, winning two with Dukla Prague during his military service, followed by five more while playing for Spartak Trnava. Other clubs he played for were Slovan Bratislava and lower-division Austrian club Slovan Wien, where he took on a player-manager role.

As a football manager, Adamec took charge of clubs in Czechoslovakia and later Slovakia. Between 1999 and 2001 he led the Slovakia national football team.

Career
In the Czechoslovak First League he played 383 matches and with 170 goals is 10th in the Czechoslovak All-Time Topscorers Table.
He was capped 44 times for Czechoslovakia, scoring 14 goals. He was a participant at the 1962 FIFA World Cup and 1970 FIFA World Cup.

His most memorable performance was his hat-trick against Brazil in match Czechoslovakia - Brazil 3:2 (1:1) played at 23 June 1968 in Bratislava. He was often incorrectly referred to as the first player ever to score a hat-trick against Brazil (Pole Ernst Wilimowski had scored four goals in the 1938 World Cup match).

After retiring as player, Adamec began with football coaching as an assistant in Spartak Trnava. Later he coached Dukla Banská Bystrica, Tatran Prešov, Spartak Trnava and Slovan Bratislava. Between 1988 and 1991, he was the manager of Inter Bratislava, winning the Slovak Cup with the club in the 1989–90 season. He was assistant to Czechoslovakia coach Václav Ježek in 1993. From 1999 to 2001 Adamec coached the Slovakia national football team. Adamec died in 2018 at the age of 76.

Honours

Player
Dukla Prague
 Czechoslovak First League: 1961–62, 1962–63

Spartak Trnava
 Czechoslovak First League: 1967–68, 1968–69, 1970–71, 1971–72, 1972–73
 Czechoslovak Cup: 1966–67, 1970–71, 1974–75
 Slovak Cup: 1970–71, 1974–75
 Mitropa Cup: 1966–67; runner-up: 1967–68

Czechoslovakia
FIFA World Cup runner-up: 1962

Manager
Inter Bratislava
 Slovak Cup: 1989–90

References

External links
 
 Osobnosti.sk 
  

1942 births
2018 deaths
People from Vrbové
Sportspeople from the Trnava Region
Slovak footballers
Czechoslovak footballers
Czechoslovak football managers
Slovak football managers
Slovak expatriate football managers
1962 FIFA World Cup players
1970 FIFA World Cup players
Czechoslovakia international footballers
Dukla Prague footballers
FC Spartak Trnava players
ŠK Slovan Bratislava players
Slovakia national football team managers
FC Spartak Trnava managers
FK Inter Bratislava managers
1. FC Tatran Prešov managers
FC Fastav Zlín managers
bohemians 1905 managers
FK Dukla Banská Bystrica managers
SK Vorwärts Steyr managers
FC DAC 1904 Dunajská Streda managers
FC Petržalka managers
Association football forwards